Bonn ist Supreme is a live performance album by composer and guitarist Robbie Basho, released on April 7, 2008 by Bo'Weavil Recordings.

Track listing

Personnel
Adapted from the Bonn ist Supreme liner notes.
 Robbie Basho – acoustic guitar
 Matthew Azevedo – mastering
 Glenn Jones – production

Release history

References

2008 live albums
Robbie Basho albums